Vs. Children is the fifth and final studio album by Casiotone for the Painfully Alone.

Track listing
All songs written by Owen Ashworth
"Casiotone for the Painfully Alone vs. Children" – 0:49
"Tom Justice, The Choir Boy Robber, Apprehended at Ace Hardware in Libertyville, IL" – 4:12
"Optimist vs. The Silent Alarm (When The Saints Go Marching In)" – 1:51
"Natural Light" – 2:23
"Traveling Salesman's Young Wife Home Alone on Christmas in Montpelier, VT" – 2:45
"Man O' War" – 3:08
"Northfield, MN" – 5:08
"Killers" – 2:39
"Harsh The Herald Angels Sing" – 3:05
"You Were Alone" – 2:58
"White Jetta" – 3:17

Notes
 The second track is based on a true story about a bank robber (and former co-worker of songwriter Owen Ashworth).

References

Casiotone for the Painfully Alone albums
2009 albums